Will Colbert (born February 6, 1985 in Arnprior, Ontario) is a Canadian former professional ice hockey player.

For the 2013–14 season he was signed by the Tilburg Trappers of Netherlands' Eredivisie league. Previously he played for the Belfast Giants in the Elite Ice Hockey League.

For the 2013-14 season, he was named the best defenseman in the Eredivisie.

Career statistics

References

External links
 

Canadian ice hockey defencemen
Belfast Giants players
Gwinnett Gladiators players
Worcester Sharks players
Kalamazoo Wings (ECHL) players
Ottawa Senators draft picks
San Jose Sharks draft picks
1985 births
Living people
People from Arnprior, Ontario
Canadian expatriate ice hockey players in Northern Ireland
Canadian expatriate ice hockey players in the Netherlands
Canadian expatriate ice hockey players in the United States